The following is a list of programs featured on Noggin. The brand launched in 1999 as a joint venture between MTV Networks (owners of Nickelodeon) and Sesame Workshop. At first, the Noggin channel featured three sections of programming: a main block aimed at pre-teens and teenagers, a morning block for preschoolers, and a "retro" block at night. In April 2002, Noggin discarded its retro block and extended its preschool and teen blocks to last 12 hours each per day. The older-skewing shows that made up Noggin's original tween and teen lineup aired exclusively during the teen block, now retitled "The N." Sesame Workshop eventually sold its 50% stake in Noggin in August 2002, but it continued to co-produce new content for the brand.

Programming blocks based on Noggin have aired in the U.S. and UK. In 2009, the Noggin network was replaced by the Nick Jr. channel, but Noggin was relaunched as a streaming app in 2015. As of 2022, the service is continually updated with new series and clips, both from Noggin's library and other companies.

1999 TV channel
The Noggin channel launched on February 2, 1999 and closed on September 28, 2009. It started out mainly aimed at tweens and teenagers, with a few of its morning programs aimed at younger children. From April 1, 2002 onward, the channel was divided into two programming blocks: a daytime block for young children and a nighttime block, called The N, for tweens and teenagers. Several shows that had previously aired during Noggin's daytime block, such as A Walk in Your Shoes and Sponk!, aired exclusively during The N from April 2002 onward.

Daytime block

Original series
Nickelodeon and Sesame Workshop created a company, Noggin LLC, to produce original content for their network in 1999. In 2002, Sesame Workshop sold its stake in Noggin LLC to Nickelodeon, but it continued to co-produce content for Noggin.

Sesame Workshop library
Reruns of series from Sesame Workshop's content library were shown as a staple of Noggin from 1999 to 2005. Two syndication packages of Sesame Street episodes, titled Sesame Street Unpaved and 123 Sesame Street, were created specifically by and for Noggin LLC.

Reruns of Nickelodeon series

Acquired programming

Interstitials 

 And Then What Happened? (2002-2003)
 Art Alive (2003–2009)
 Brain Food (1999–2002)
 Critter Corner (2003–2009)
 Deja Noggin (1999-2002)
 Field Trip (2003–2009)
 Former Kids (1999–2002)
 Game Time (2002-2003)
 The Girl with Her Head Coming Off (1999–2002)
 Head Buzzers (1999–2002)
 Inside Eddie Johnson (1999–2002)
 Inside Out Boy (1999–2002)
 Let's Do Math! (2005–2008)
 Letter and Number Soup (1999–2002)
 Max and His Alphabet Adventures
 Sesame Street Number Segments
 Lily in the City (2005–2009)
 Live@Noggin.com (bumpers; 2000–2002)
 Looking at Each Other (1999–2002)
 Maggie and the Ferocious Beast (shorts; 1999–2002)
 Maisy Songs (2000-2007)
 Move to the Music (2003–2009)
 My Wacky Family (1999-2002)
 Nickelodeon's Big Help: Talk Together (2001–2002)
 Noggin Boogie (1999–2002)
 Jungle Boogie
 The Space Between Mr. Frear's Ears
 Nick Jr. Sings
 Noggin's Choice (1999–2000)
 Noggin Gold (1999–2002)
 Noggin Neighbors (2000–2002)
 Nanalan' (2000–2002)
 What's the Buzz with Philomena Fly (1999–2002)
 Winky Love (1999–2002)
 Noggin Presents (1999–2002; 2007–2009)
 Ask Mother Nature (1999–2002)
 Chickiepoo and Fluff: Barnyard Detectives (2007–2009)
 Me in a Box (2000–2002)
 Peppa Pig (2007–2009)
 Nogginoid (1999–2002)
 Noggin's Thoughts (1999–2002)
 Noggolution (1999–2002)
 Oobi (shorts and bumpers; 2000–2009)
 Out of Your Mind (1999–2002)
 Puzzle Time (2008-2009)
 Sesame Street Hits (1999–2002)
 Short Films by Short People (1999–2002)
 Show and Tell (2003–2009)
 Snack Time (2005–2009)
 Cooking for Kids with Luis (2005–2009)
 Story Time (2003–2009)
 Ted the Head (1999–2002)
 Think Loudly (1999–2002)
 What's in Heidi's Head? (1999–2002)
 What Sparks You? (1999–2002)
 The Whooton Observer (1999–2002)
 Zee's Bookshelf (2005–2009)
 Ebb and Flo

The N block
Noggin aired a nighttime programming block called The N (standing for Noggin) from April 1, 2002 until December 31, 2007.

Original programming

Acquired programming

2015 streaming service

Current programming
In March 2015, the Noggin brand was relaunched as a video-on-demand streaming app. It has featured shows from the original Noggin channel as well as some exclusive shows and currently-running series from Nickelodeon's library.

Original programming

Programming from Nickelodeon

Acquired programming

Former programming

Programming from Noggin and Nickelodeon

Acquired programming

See also
List of Sesame Workshop productions
 List of programs broadcast by Nickelodeon
 List of programs broadcast by Nick Jr.
 List of programs broadcast by Nick at Nite
 List of programs broadcast by Nicktoons
 List of programs broadcast by TeenNick
 List of Nickelodeon original films

Notes

References

Lists of television series by network
Nickelodeon-related lists